Julia Francesca Barretto Baldivia (born March 10, 1997), better known for her screen name Julia Barretto, is a Filipino actress and model.

Dubbed as the “Drama Princess” of her generation by various media outlet, Barretto was inducted at Eastwood City Walk of Fame. In 2017, she won her first Best film Actress award at the Platinum Stallion Media Award. She has already earned a nomination for Best Actress at the 66th FAMAS Award and has since won 2 including a Special Award & the German Moreno Youth Achievement Award. In 2020, Barretto was ranked as the 7th among Filipino celebrities with the most followers on Instagram.

Barretto has also starred in a lead role in several blockbuster films including: 'Unexpectedly Yours', 'Vince and Kath and James' and 'Love You to the Stars and Back', all of which grossing more than ₱100 million each in the box office.

Early life
She was born to actors Dennis Padilla and Marjorie Barretto, and has siblings from both her parents' respective sides. She is a member of the Barretto clan, a prominent entertainment family which includes actresses Claudine Barretto and Gretchen Barretto. She finished grade school (Grades 1 to 7) at Miriam College in Loyola Heights Katipunan Avenue Quezon City in March 2011. She started high school at Miriam College from freshman to sophomore year, where she played as a member of their varsity volleyball team in the WNCAA, until she transferred to St. Paul College in Pasig in 2013 during her junior year under their curriculum for professional talents after signing a contract with Star Magic. She finally graduated high school in 2015.

Career

Barretto rose to prominence after being cast in ABS-CBN's Kokey, where she played the lead role of Anna Calugdan. The latter returned in showbiz as part of the Star Magic Circle 2013 alongside Janella Salvador, Liza Soberano, Kit Thompson, and Khalil Ramos as some of her batchmates. She forthwith starred in the 2014 noontime drama, Mirabella (TV series), which eventually led to her consequent success topbilling top-rated films and series. In the course of her acting career, Barretto was paired with several actors into a loveteam. This includes Enrique Gil, Iñigo Pascual, Joshua Garcia, Gerald Anderson and Carlo Aquino to name a few. At some point, she was launched as one of the Asap It Girls together with Liza Soberano, Janella Salvador and Kathryn Bernardo.

In 2020, Barretto left Star Magic to sign a contract with Viva Artist Agency.

Filmography

Film

Television

Awards and nominations

References

External links

 
 

Living people
ABS-CBN personalities
Actresses from Metro Manila
Julia
Filipino child actresses
Filipino film actresses
Filipino female models
People from Marikina
Star Magic
1997 births
Filipino people of Spanish descent
Filipino television actresses
21st-century Filipino actresses